Hüseyin Özer (born 1949 in Reşadiye, Tokat Province, Turkey) is a Turkish British executive chef and restaurateur, who owns a restaurant chain based in London.

Early life
Hüseyin Özer was born in 1949, in a village of Reşadiye town in Tokat Province in northern Turkey. His parents separated when he was very young. Unwanted by his parents, Özer was raised by his grandfather. Unable to attend primary school, he taught himself to read and write.

Working in his village as a shepherd, Özer was sent at the age of eleven to Ankara to earn money, where he became a street kid. To learn English, he bought books. In 1967, he moved to Istanbul, where he found employment in restaurants as a dish washer. He continued to learn English, paying a tutor to teach him.

Following his military service, Hüseyin went to London in 1975 by bus, as he could not afford to fly there. There, he worked in a döner kebab shop in Mayfair and attended English courses in his spare time.

Career
Özer acquired the döner kebab shop he was working in, and turned it into a restaurant in 1981. His success paved the way for him to open more London restaurants, called "Sofra" (in Turkish dining table), in Covent Garden, Mayfair, Regent Street and St John's Wood. Each restaurant is unique. The menus consist of typical mezes, kebabs and desserts of Turkish cuisine.

He has owned up to twenty cafés and restaurants in several locations in London. However, his current focus remains on the two fine dining restaurants.

In addition to his restaurant business, chef Özer runs a catering service company.

Özer has an estimated personal fortune of £37 million, according to television programme, The World's Richest People.

Social life
Dedicated to education, Özer established a trust in Ankara in his early years, which turned into a foundation named "Hüseyin Özer Education Foundation". In a partnership program with Middlesex University, he teaches students how to open and run successful restaurants. He has contributed to the Turkish-English Chamber of Commerce.

Recognition
In 2011, Özer was honoured with the Entrepreneur of the Year award by the Star Network at the World Food Awards.
In 2007–2008, his restaurant in Regent Street was recommended by Michelin Guide.

He is one of the three Turkish people who featured in the Discovery Channel's programme World's Richest People.

In 2011, Hüseyin Özer was given an honorary Doctorate of Letters by the University of Westminster.

Book

References

External links
Hüseyin Özer website

1949 births
People from Reşadiye
British chefs
British restaurateurs
Turkish chefs
Turkish restaurateurs
Living people
Turkish emigrants to the United Kingdom